Nancy Purves (born August 6, 1949 in Topeka, Kansas) is an American sprint canoer who competed in the early 1970s. She was eliminated in the semifinals of the K-2 500 m event at the 1972 Summer Olympics in Munich.

References
Sports-reference.com profile

1949 births
Sportspeople from Topeka, Kansas
American female canoeists
Canoeists at the 1972 Summer Olympics
Living people
Olympic canoeists of the United States
21st-century American women